Pochaina may refer to:

 , a steeped-in-legend river in Kyiv
 Pochaina (Kiev Metro), a subway station in Kyiv
 3441 Pochaina, a main-belt asteroid